Sathyamangalam Tiger Reserve is a protected area and tiger reserve in the Eastern Ghats in the Erode District of the Indian state of Tamil Nadu. It has a tiger population of 83 individuals and a leopard population of 111 individuals according to the 2019 census.

First various geographical tracts of the Sathyamangalam forests were declared reserve forests. Patches of Sandalwood Reserves were notified under the Indian Forests Act, 1927. The Sathyamangalam Forest Division is part of the Bramhagiri-Nilgiris-Eastern Ghats Elephant Reserve notified in 2003. In 2013, with an area of 1408.6 sq. km. of the erstwhile sanctuary was notified as Sathyamangalam Tiger Reserve, the fourth tiger reserve in the state of Tamil Nadu as a part of Project Tiger and is the third largest tiger reserve in Tamil Nadu.

Sathyamangalam Tiger Reserve, the Gateway to Eastern Ghats, is a significant ecosystem and a wildlife corridor in the Nilgiri Biosphere Reserve between the Western Ghats and the rest of the Eastern Ghats and a genetic link between the five other protected areas which it adjoins, including the Billigiriranga Swamy Temple Wildlife Sanctuary, Sigur Plateau, Mudumalai National Park, Bandipur National Park and the Cauvery Wildlife Sanctuary. All ranges of the Sathyamangalam and Hasanur Forest Divisions except T.N. Palayam range falls within Sathyamangalam and Thalavadi taluks while T.N. Palayam Range falls both in Sathyamangalam and Gobichettipalayam taluks of Erode District in north western Tamil Nadu.

History
The Sathyamangalam Forest Taluk and corresponding Forest Range was under the charge of the District Forest Officer, Coimbatore. The head-quarters of the range officer was at Cusbah or Head-quarter Station Sathyamangalam (Sathyamangalam in Tamil) Sathyamangalam range was guarded by a forestor who was at Jalamllay, Sathyamangalam with 8 guards. Patches of Sandalwood Reserves were notified under the Indian Forests Act, 1927. The Sathyamangalam Forest Division is part of the Bramhagiri-Nilgiris-Eastern Ghats Elephant Reserve notified in 2003. Sathyamangalam Forest Division was declared a wildlife sanctuary with effect from 3 November 2008 by the Government of Tamil Nadu as per the Wild Life Protection Act of 1972. In 2008, the Government of Karnataka sent a proposal to declare the contiguous Billigiriranga Swamy Temple Wildlife Sanctuary as a tiger reserve which was subsequently approved in 2010. In a wildlife survey conducted by the Government of Tamil Nadu in 2010, 46 tigers were sighted in the Sathyamangalam forest area. In July 2010, the Minister of State for Environment and Forests Jairam Ramesh requested the Chief Minister of Tamil Nadu to consider the possibility of proposing the Sathyamangalam wildlife sanctuary as a Project Tiger tiger reserve as per the provisions of the Wildlife Protection Act of 1972 as the area is contiguous with the forests of Bandipur and Mudumalai tiger reserves. On 1 April 2010, the Government of Tamil Nadu announced that it would initiate action to declare the sanctuary as a tiger reserve because of the consistent sighting of tigers in the forest area and the tiger reserve declaration would strengthen wildlife conservation efforts, as the sanctuary managers will get more financial support from the central government and the Government of India may also provide support to appoint an additional anti-poaching watchers and fund the establishment of anti-poaching camps.

On 10 March 2011, the Principal Chief Conservator of Forests said that the proposal for according tiger reserve status for the Sathyamangalam Reserve Forests is under consideration. He said that studies using camera traps indicated there could be 19 to 25 tigers in Sathyamangalam forests. A 2011 camera trap tiger density study conducted by World Wildlife Fund indicated that the sanctuary is home to at least 25 tigers. In the same year, a DNA based project initiated by the state forest department collected 150 samples of pugmarks from Sathyamangalam forests and 69 of them were found positive for tigers by tests conducted at the Center for Molecular Biology in Hyderabad. The findings also indicated that the region is home to as many as 30 tigers.

Supported by the reports of tiger sightings, the Tamil Nadu Forest Department submitted a detailed report to the state government supporting the tiger reserve proposal. The proposal came up for consideration before the Tamil Nadu Council of Ministers in 2012. On 6 April 2012, the Chief Wildlife Warden said that the proposal to have a tiger reserve in Sathyamangalam has been sent to the Ministry of Environment and Forests for approval and funding. On 18 March 2013, the Government of India order declared that the Sathyamangalam wildlife sanctuary will become the fourth tiger reserve in the state, with the other three being Mudumalai, Anamalai and Kalakkad-Mundanthurai.

Expanse

The boundaries of the sanctuary were the Thalavadi range of Thalamalai forests and Hasanur, T.N.Palayam ranges of Gobichettipalayam taluk of Guthiyalathur forests, contiguous with Billigiriranga Swamy Temple Wildlife Sanctuary in the north and the rivers of Moyar and Bhavani, contiguous with Mudumalai National Park and Sigur Plateau in the south. The eastern boundary is formed by the Bargur reserved forests in Anthiyur taluk and Bandipur National Park in the west. The sanctuary includes the areas of Guthiyalathur reserved forests, Guthiyalathur extension, Thalamalai reserved forests and Thalamalai extension.

In September 2011, the Department of forests increased the sanctuary area by declaring an additional  in seven reserve forests of Sathyamangalam forest division. Of the total area, the core zone comprises  reserved forests and tourism is allowed in the buffer zone with only forest officials permitted entry into the core zone.

Flora

The Sathyamangalam forest is mostly tropical dry forest, part of the South Deccan Plateau dry deciduous forests ecoregion. There are five distinct forest types: tropical evergreen (Shola), semi-evergreen, mixed-deciduous, dry deciduous and thorn forests. These patches are threatened on account of land use changing to hill agriculture and plantation crops, including fruit. Semi-evergreen forests are found at high altitude. Mixed and dry deciduous forests are located on middle altitude slopes and the thorn forests are usually found in the foothills and some times, due degradation of dry deciduous forests, at the middle elevations. About 65% of the forest division is under forest cover. Significant areas of mixed shrubland and grasslands support a large population of herbivore ungulates, the preferred prey of tigers.

Fauna

The Sathyamangalam forests link the Eastern Ghats and Western Ghats allowing gene flow between diverse fauna populations of the two eco-regions. 
The 2009 wildlife survey conducted by Government of Tamil Nadu enumerated 10 Bengal tiger, 866 Indian elephants, 672 gaurs, and 27 leopards. The survey party observed four additional species of horned antelope including 2,348 spotted deer, 1,068 blackbucks, 304 sambar deer, 77 barking deer and four-horned antelopes, 843 wild boars, and 43 sloth bears. Herds of the famous feral buffaloes can also be spotted in places near the Moyar river.

The 2010 wildlife survey counted 12 Bengal tigers. In December 2011, the Conservator of Forests of Tamil Nadu stated that the sanctuary is home to at least 28 tigers as confirmed by a camera trap study conducted by World Wildlife Fund. In the 2012 national wildlife survey, 25 tigers were recorded. As per the 2011 census, the Sathyamangalam forests was home to over 850 Indian elephants and is part of a protected area, which consists of the largest Asian elephant population in the world.

Birds
Many bird species including treepies, bulbuls, babblers, mynahs and crows were noted. In 2010, the first ever bird survey was conducted in the Sathyamangalam forests. A total of 230 species of birds were recorded in the survey. In 2010, a small population of critically endangered Indian vulture (Gyps indicus) and three other species of vultures were discovered to be thriving in the Moyar river valley. 20 nests were sighted and the population was estimated to consist up of 40 adults. Last sighted in the region in the 1970s, the rediscovery of the vulture, a bird rapidly disappearing from India, has been significant. Diclofenac, which caused the decline of vulture population was banned in 2006 and since then, vulture numbers have started to grow back.

Issues and conservation 
Conservation of the Sathyamangalam Forest Division is administered by the Tamil Nadu Forest Department governed through Chief Conservator of Forests, Erode, Deputy Director, Hasanur and Deputy Director, Sathyamangalam. The wildlife sanctuary is part of Project Tiger and Project Elephant conservation programmes run by the Government of India. The sanctuary is listed among the top five places in India for poaching tigers by the international wild life trade monitoring network, TRAFFIC. In February 2016, the National Tiger Conservation Authority announced that drones will be used to monitor tiger population in five tiger reserves including Sathyamangalam.

The reserve also faces issues due to forest fires, uncontrolled grazing of cattle and growth of invasive plant species, damaging the ecosystem. Man-animal conflicts are common especially with elephants and leopards. Elephants raid crop fields and illegal electric fences used to protect crops mortally wound elephants and five elephants were electrocuted in three-month period between January and April 2013. Leopards prey on domestic cattle with as many as 27 goats killed by them in a single month in November 2012. National highway 948 passes through the wildlife sanctuary and wildlife deaths have been reported due to vehicular movement in the highway at night.

Tribal population
These forests are home to indigenous tribal people belonging largely to the Irula tribe (also known as the Urali) and Soliga communities. In 2011, the Tamil Nadu state forest department officials conducted a study on the cattle and human population in the seven forest settlements and 12 revenue settlements inside the protected area. As of 2013, tribals engage in collecting honey, more than 900 families live in 138 villages within a  radius surrounding the park. The tribals engage in agriculture, grazing of animals and collecting minor forest produce such as honey, tubers, fuel wood and fish. According to the Scheduled Tribes and Other Traditional Forest Dwellers (Recognition of Forest Rights) Act, 2006, the tribals were entitled to use designated land within the park area for agriculture and the title deeds for the same are to be distributed within 2016 after the Supreme Court of India vacated a stay order issued by the Madras High Court prohibiting the same.

The forests were also the home of notorious criminal and bandit Veerapan, who made a living poaching ivory and sandalwood from the forests and selling them on the black market. Veerapan was killed by the Tamil Nadu Police in October 2004.

References

External links

Wildlife sanctuaries in Tamil Nadu
Erode district
Wildlife sanctuaries of the Western Ghats
2008 establishments in Tamil Nadu
Protected areas established in 2008